Anolacia is a genus of sea snails, marine gastropod mollusks in the family Ancillariidae.

Species
Species within the genus Anolacia include:

 Anolacia aperta (G.B. Sowerby I, 1825)
 Anolacia bozzettii Prati, 1995
 Anolacia mauritiana (G.B. Sowerby I, 1830)

References

Ancillariidae